The 2012 Asturian regional election was held on Sunday, 25 March 2012, to elect the 9th General Junta of the Principality of Asturias. All 45 seats in the General Junta were up for election. The election was held simultaneously with a regional election in Andalusia.

This was a snap election held as a result of the incumbent government under Francisco Álvarez-Cascos failing to pass the 2012 budget in the General Junta after just six months in power. The Asturian Socialist Federation (FSA–PSOE) under Javier Fernández, which had scored first in votes but second in seats in the previous election, went on to win a decisive victory whereas Álvarez Cascos' Asturias Forum (FAC) lost its seat plurality of seats it had won in the previous election and fell from 16 to 12 seats. The People's Party (PP) was unable to improve on its 2011 results despite a change of leadership and remained stagnant at 10 seats, while United Left (IU/IX) grew from 4 to 5 seats. Voter turnout was the lowest since 1983, as just 51.1% of the electorate cast a ballot.

The election resulted in a draw between the centre-left (PSOE–IU) and centre-right (FAC–PP) blocs after the counting of the vote of those living abroad deprived FAC from a seat in the Western District, awarding it to PSOE. Union, Progress and Democracy (UPyD), which managed to get into parliament after failure in 2011 to do so, became determinant for either bloc to attain an absolute majority, with ensuing negotiations resulting in a Socialist minority government led by Javier Fernández.

Overview

Electoral system
The General Junta of the Principality of Asturias was the devolved, unicameral legislature of the autonomous community of Asturias, having legislative power in regional matters as defined by the Spanish Constitution and the Asturian Statute of Autonomy, as well as the ability to vote confidence in or withdraw it from a regional president.

Voting for the General Junta was on the basis of universal suffrage, which comprised all nationals over 18 years of age, registered in Asturias and in full enjoyment of their political rights. Additionally, Asturians abroad were required to apply for voting before being permitted to vote, a system known as "begged" or expat vote. The 45 members of the General Junta of the Principality of Asturias were elected using the D'Hondt method and a closed list proportional representation, with an electoral threshold of three percent of valid votes—which included blank ballots—being applied in each constituency. Seats were allocated to constituencies, which were established by law as follows:

Central District, comprising the municipalities of Aller, Avilés, Bimenes, Carreño, Caso, Castrillón, Corvera de Asturias, Gijón, Gozón, Illas, Las Regueras, Langreo, Laviana, Lena, Llanera, Mieres, Morcín, Noreña, Oviedo, Proaza, Quirós, Ribera de Arriba, Riosa, San Martín del Rey Aurelio, Santo Adriano, Sariego, Siero, Sobrescobio and Soto del Barco.
Eastern District, comprising the municipalities of Amieva, Cabrales, Cabranes, Cangas de Onís, Caravia, Colunga, Llanes, Nava, Onís, Parres, Peñamellera Alta, Peñamellera Baja, Piloña, Ponga, Ribadedeva, Ribadesella and Villaviciosa.
Western District, comprising the municipalities of Allande, Belmonte de Miranda, Boal, Candamo, Cangas del Narcea, Castropol, Coaña, Cudillero, Degaña, El Franco, Grado, Grandas de Salime, Ibias, Illano, Muros de Nalón, Navia, Pesoz, Pravia, Salas, San Martín de Oscos, Santa Eulalia de Oscos, San Tirso de Abres, Somiedo, Tapia de Casariego, Taramundi, Teverga, Tineo, Valdés, Vegadeo, Villanueva de Oscos, Villayón and Yernes y Tameza.

Each constituency was allocated an initial minimum of two seats, with the remaining 39 being distributed in proportion to their populations.

The use of the D'Hondt method might result in a higher effective threshold, depending on the district magnitude.

The electoral law allowed for parties and federations registered in the interior ministry, coalitions and groupings of electors to present lists of candidates. Parties and federations intending to form a coalition ahead of an election were required to inform the relevant Electoral Commission within ten days of the election call, whereas groupings of electors needed to secure the signature of at least one percent of the electorate in the constituencies for which they sought election, disallowing electors from signing for more than one list of candidates.

Election date
The term of the General Junta of the Principality of Asturias expired four years after the date of its previous election. Elections to the General Junta were fixed for the fourth Sunday of May every four years.

The president had the prerogative to dissolve the General Junta and call a snap election, provided that no motion of no confidence was in process, no nationwide election was due and some time requirements were met: namely, that dissolution did not occur either during the first legislative session or within the legislature's last year ahead of its scheduled expiry, nor before one year had elapsed since a previous dissolution under this procedure. In the event of an investiture process failing to elect a regional president within a two-month period from the first ballot, the General Junta was to be automatically dissolved and a fresh election called. Any snap election held as a result of these circumstances would not alter the period to the next ordinary election, with elected deputies merely serving out what remained of their four-year terms.

Parliamentary composition

The General Junta of the Principality of Asturias was officially dissolved on 30 January 2012, after the publication of the dissolution decree in the Official Gazette of the Principality of Asturias. The table below shows the composition of the parliamentary groups in the General Junta at the time of dissolution.

Opinion polls
The table below lists voting intention estimates in reverse chronological order, showing the most recent first and using the dates when the survey fieldwork was done, as opposed to the date of publication. Where the fieldwork dates are unknown, the date of publication is given instead. The highest percentage figure in each polling survey is displayed with its background shaded in the leading party's colour. If a tie ensues, this is applied to the figures with the highest percentages. The "Lead" column on the right shows the percentage-point difference between the parties with the highest percentages in a poll. When available, seat projections determined by the polling organisations are displayed below (or in place of) the percentages in a smaller font; 23 seats were required for an absolute majority in the General Junta of the Principality of Asturias.

Results

Overall

Distribution by constituency

Aftermath

After the election, the leader of the Asturian PSOE, Javier Fernández, and incumbent Asturian President, Francisco Álvarez Cascos, were tasked to form a coalition government. The election led to a political impasse as the center-left (PSOE and IU-IX) and center-right coalitions (FAC and PP) each gained 22 seats in the election (23 seats are required for a majority in the 45-seat Assembly). The remaining seat was held by the centrist UPyD, which became the kingmaker in the negotiation.

Coalition talks took almost two months to reach an agreement. One of the main events during the negotiation was the legal battle in the Spanish Constitutional Court over the 45th seat, the assignment of which was delayed by the counting of the ballots of those voting abroad. FAC disputed the seat's assignment to the PSOE and asked for a revote; however, the Constitutional Court rejected the appeal and upheld the seat for the PSOE.

UPyD finally agreed to support a PSOE government, their main reason to do so being the threat by Finance Minister Cristóbal Montoro to intervene in Asturian government accounts. On 23 May 2012, PSOE leader Javier Fernández was elected as the new President of the Principality of Asturias with support from IU and UPyD.

References
Opinion poll sources

Other

2012 in Asturias
Asturias
Regional elections in Asturias
March 2012 events in Europe